David E. Clarenbach (born September 26, 1953) is a Wisconsin Democratic politician and gay activist who served nine terms in the Wisconsin State Assembly and as Speaker pro tempore for ten years.

Early life and education 
Clarenbach was born in St. Louis, Missouri and spent his kindergarten year in New York City before his parents moved to Madison. While in high school in Madison public schools, Clarenbach got involved in an effort to place student representatives on the Madison School Board, and in 1969, at age 16, he spent his spring break registering voters in rural Mississippi. Clarenbach studied politics at the University of Wisconsin–Madison from 1971 to 1976. He is the grandson of A. E. Frederick and son of National Organization for Women co-founder Kathryn F. Clarenbach and Henry Clarenbach, a delegate for Eugene McCarthy.

Career

Elected office 
Clarenbach was elected to the Dane County Board of Supervisors in 1972, at age 18. In 1974, he was elected a Madison alderman, before being elected to the Wisconsin State Assembly that same year at the age of 21, succeeding fellow Democrat Edward Nager.

In 1982, Clarenbach was widely credited with helping push through the first law in the country which prohibited discrimination in employment, housing and public accommodations on the basis of sexual orientation. It was a landmark achievement for LGBT rights in Wisconsin and across the nation. While in the assembly, Clarenbach also worked to improve lake quality and expand authority of the Wisconsin Department of Natural Resources, authored a new HIV confidentiality law, and an AIDS bill of rights.

In 1983 he was elected Speaker pro tempore of the Assembly, a position he held until 1993. Clarenbach served on the following committees: Agriculture; Assembly Organization; Financial Institutions and Insurance; Labor; Rules; Legislative Council; Judiciary; Commerce and Consumer Affairs; State Historical Society Board of Curators; and as chairperson of the Health Insurance Reform committee. His legislative papers are on deposit with the Wisconsin Historical Society.

In the Democratic primary election held on September 8, Clarenbach faced Ada Deer and lost with 31,961 votes (40.1%) to Deer's 47,777 (59.9%). Deer went on to lose to incumbent Republican Scott L. Klug in the general election.

He was succeeded in the assembly by Tammy Baldwin, who ran as the first openly gay legislative candidate in Wisconsin history.

Activism 
Clarenbach led the Madison AIDS Support Network and later served as executive director of the Gay and Lesbian Victory Fund from 1996 to 1997. Clarenbach was also a member of the Urban League, Humane Society, ACLU of Wisconsin, and National Council of Senior Citizens. He was a voting delegate to the 1980, 1984 and 1988 Democratic National Conventions.

Personal life 
Clarenbach now works as a political consultant and lives in Madison, Wisconsin. He has served as the campaign treasurer for State Representative Chris Taylor.

Sexuality and political office 
Clarenbach is openly gay, although he was not open during his political career in Madison. He told a reporter in 2001, "It was a different era. There were no openly gay elected officials.... Even in the liberal stronghold of Madison, it would have done more than raise eyebrows. It would’ve hampered a person's electability. Yet I think it's safe to say that every member of the Legislature and every member of the Capitol press corps knew I was gay.... The general consensus was not to intrude into one's personal life." He served as a mentor for fellow gay State Representative Tim Carpenter of Milwaukee. During his early years in public life and activism, Clarenbach was in a private relationship with Jim Yeadon, first openly-gay elected official and advocate for LGBT rights in Wisconsin.

References 

1953 births
Living people
Democratic Party members of the Wisconsin State Assembly
Politicians from St. Louis
Politicians from Madison, Wisconsin
LGBT state legislators in Wisconsin
Gay politicians
LGBT people from Wisconsin
University of Wisconsin–Madison College of Letters and Science alumni
21st-century American LGBT people
20th-century American LGBT people